Nanker Phelge (a.k.a. Nanker/Phelge) was a collective pseudonym used between 1963 and 1965 for several Rolling Stones group compositions. Stones bassist Bill Wyman explained the origins of the name in his 2002 book, Rolling with the Stones:

Thus anything credited to Nanker Phelge refers to a Mick Jagger/Brian Jones/Keith Richards/Charlie Watts/Bill Wyman/Andrew Loog Oldham collaborative composition.  The ASCAP files for the very earliest Nanker Phelge compositions also list early Rolling Stones member Ian Stewart (also known as "the sixth Stone") as a co-author covered by the pseudonym.

The name resurfaced in the late 1960s on the labels of the original vinyl pressings of Beggars Banquet and Let It Bleed. Manufacture of both albums was credited to Nanker Phelge, which was then acknowledged as an ABKCO company (ABKCO was manufacturing the records that still bore the London and Decca labels).

Songs credited to Nanker Phelge

"Stoned" (Oct. 1963) (ASCAP also credits Ian Stewart as co-writer)
"Little by Little" (Feb. 1964) (credited as 'Phelge') (co-written with Phil Spector; ASCAP also credits Ian Stewart as co-writer)
"Andrew's Blues" (Feb. 1964) (unreleased)
"And Mr. Spector and Mr. Pitney Came Too" (Feb. 1964) (an instrumental blues-rock jam with prominent harmonica, unreleased, co-written with Phil Spector) Appears on the Black Box bootleg compilation.
"Now I've Got a Witness" (credited as 'Phelge') (Apr. 1964)
"Stewed and Keefed (Brian's Blues)" (Jun. 1964)
"2120 South Michigan Avenue" (Aug. 1964)
"Empty Heart" (Aug. 1964)
"Off the Hook" (Nov. 1964) (originally credited to "Nanker, Phelge", but now credited to Jagger/Richards by BMI)
"Play with Fire" (Feb. 1965)
"The Under Assistant West Coast Promotion Man" (May 1965)
"The Spider and the Fly" (July 1965) (originally credited to "Nanker, Phelge" but now credited to Jagger/Richards by BMI)
"I'm All Right" (July 1965) (sometimes credited to Phelge/McDaniel, although it is an Ellas McDaniel cover song. Now credited to Jagger/Richards)
"Godzi" (unreleased but registered with BMI)
"We Want the Stones" (a recording of the audience cheering on the 1965 Got Live If You Want It! EP)
Bill Wyman claims in his books that "Paint It Black" was a collective effort of the group, and should have been credited to Nanker Phelge, but mistakenly was credited to Jagger/Richards.

See also
 Jagger/Richards

References

External links
More About Nanker Phelge

The Rolling Stones
Fictional musicians
Collective pseudonyms